The following table presents a listing of Ghana's 16 Regions ranked in order of their surface area.

See also
Regions of Ghana
List of Ghanaian regional ministers
List of Ghanaian regions by population
Ghanaian Government Official Listing of Regions In Ghana

Regions
Ghana, Regions of, by area
Ghana, area
 by area